or  or  is a village in Kautokeino Municipality in Troms og Finnmark county, Norway.  

The village is made up predominantly of Sami people, a non-Norwegian group indigenous to the Fennoscandinavian peninsula .

Masi Church has stood in the town since the 17th century. The present church building is a reconstruction built after the original was torched by German soldiers during the Nazi occupation of Norway in World War II.

During the late 1970s, the Norwegian government planned to construct the Alta Hydroelectric Power Station downstream, which was expected to flood Masi, upstream Kautokeino, and surrounding reindeer pasture. Masi was among several sites of protest in what became known later as the Alta controversy.

References

External links

Kautokeino
Villages in Finnmark
Populated places of Arctic Norway